Cinnamomum burmannii (or Cinnamomum burmanni), also known as Indonesian cinnamon, Padang cassia, Batavia cassia, or korintje, is one of several plants in the genus Cinnamomum whose bark is sold as the spice cinnamon. The most common and cheapest type of cinnamon in the US is made from powdered C. burmannii. C. burmannii oil contains no eugenol, but higher amounts of coumarin than C. cassia and Ceylon cinnamon with 2.1 g/kg in an authenticated sample, and a mean of 5.0 g/kg in 8 samples tested. It is also sold as quills of one layer.

Description
Cinnamomum burmannii is an evergreen tree growing up to 7 m in height with aromatic bark and smooth, angular branches. Small yellow flowers bloom in early summer, and produce a dark drupe.

Distribution
Cinnamomum burmanii is native to Southeast Asia and Indonesia. It is normally found in West Sumatra and western Jambi province, with the Kerinci region being especially known as the center of production of quality, high essential-oil crops. C. burmanii grows in wet, tropical climates, and is an introduced species in parts of the subtropical world, particularly in Hawaiʻi, where it is naturalized and invasive. It was introduced to Hawaiʻi from Asia in 1934 as a crop plant.

Use
Aromatic oil can be extracted from the bark, leaves, and roots of Cinnamomum burmannii. The bark is also used as a cinnamon bark. The leaves can be used as a spice for preserved food and canned meat instead of laurel leaves. The core contains fat, which can be squeezed for industrial use. The wood is used for fine furniture and other fine work materials. C. burmannii is also a Chinese herbal medicine.

Gallery

References

External links
 Hawaiian Ecosystems at Risk project (HEAR) Cinnamomum burmannii Page

burmannii
Spices